Alexandre Carneiro Monteiro de Freitas (born 9 September, 1972) commonly known as Alexandre "Soca" Freitas is a Brazilian grappler, Brazilian Jiu-Jitsu competitor and instructor. He is the founder of Soca BJJ.

Brazilian Jiu Jitsu

Freitas began training at fifteen years old. At first, Soca spent many of his early years surfing. His brother, Flavio Freitas, who was a blue belt at the time, trained at Carlos Gracie Jr Academy. It was then Soca decided to give Jiu-Jitsu a try. It was at Carlos Gracie Jr. Academy that Soca would begin learning under Jean Jacques Machado. Machado showed Soca the most effective techniques which helped establish the foundation for Soca’s legendary Jiu-Jitsu skill. Soca was awarded his black belt in 1994 by Carlos Gracie Jr.

Since then, Soca has won many prestigious titles. He is an eight-time World Master Champion, 2016 and 2017 Abu Dhabi World Pro Legends Light Weight Champion and was elected the best match of the event, ADCC World Champion and elected the most technical competitor of the event, five-time PAN American Champion, Pan American No-gi Champion, and Brazilian National Champion. He still holds the number one spot in the IBBJF world ranking in his division and has for many years.

During his time in Brasil, Soca trained and learned from many world champions such as Renzo Gracie, Ralph Gracie, Roger Gracie, Roberto “Gordo” Correa, Helio “Soneca” Moreira, Vinicius “Draculino” Magalhães, Ryan Gracie, Daniel Gracie, João “Big Head” Paulo, Romel Cardoso, Mauricio “Tinguinha”, Antonio “Nino” Schembri, Roberto “Roleta”, Nelson Monteiro, Rafael “Gordinho” Correa, Regis Calixto, Eduardo “Duda” Galvão, Marcio “Pe de Pano” Cruz, and many others.

Soca has not stopped competing since the age of fifteen. His wife, Samantha, and three children all compete in IBBJF events. Samantha is a seven-time World Master Champion. His children are following in his footsteps holding their own titles as Kids Pan American Champions, International Kids Champions, and Long Island Pride Champions.

Soca began his journey teaching jiu-jitsu in 1993. Soca Brazilian Jiu-Jitsu Academy opened in 2005. Since then, he has dedicated his experience and hard work to his school. There are currently three Academies opened under his name located in Wantagh NY, Glen Cove NY, and San Diego CA. He has developed a BJJ program to cater to any type of student both competitors and non-competitors. The academy has many titles including IBJJF Team Champion and Long Island Pride Tournament Kids and Adults Champion. Professor Soca has ninety-two black belt students under his name. He attributes much of the academy’s success to his wife Samantha.

Soca has also teamed up with his oldest friends and teammates Roberto “Gordo”, Mauricio “Tinguinha”, Marcio “pe de Pano”, and Regis Calixto to create a non profit organization R1NG BJJ Team. The team consists of multiple schools here in America and Brazil. The goal of R1NG is to bring a bigger team to compete at the world-level jiu-jitsu championships.

He is an 8-time IBJJF World Master Champion having won in 2013,2014,2015, 2016 No Gi Champion, 2018. 2019, 2020,2021

On July 28, 2018 he announced via his Twitter account to have received his 6th degree blackbelt from Jean Jacques Machado.

Instructor lineage
Mitsuyo "Count Koma" Maeda → Carlos Gracie, Sr. → Helio Gracie → Carlos Gracie Jr. → Alexandre Freitas

Personal life
When he was 18 years old, he started training boxing so Renzo Gracie and Carlos Gracie Jr. started calling him "Socador" or "Soca" which means a puncher or striker. Eventually everybody at the Gracie Barra Academy started calling him "Soca".

Mixed martial arts record

| 
|-
| Loss
| align=center| 0–1
| Yoshiro Maeda
| TKO (flying knee and punches)
| Pancrase: Brave 2
| 
| align=center| 2 
| align=center| 0:25 
| Osaka, Japan
| 
|-
|}

See also
List of Brazilian Jiu-Jitsu practitioners

References

Living people
Brazilian male mixed martial artists
Mixed martial artists utilizing Brazilian jiu-jitsu
Brazilian practitioners of Brazilian jiu-jitsu
Brazilian expatriate sportspeople in the United States
People awarded a black belt in Brazilian jiu-jitsu
Sportspeople from Rio de Janeiro (state)
1972 births